Ankhi Mukherjee is an academic specialising in Victorian and Modern English literature, critical theory and postcolonial and world literature. In 2015, she was appointed a Professor of English and World Literatures by the University of Oxford.

Career 

Ankhi Mukherjee received a doctor of philosophy degree (PhD) from Rutgers University in the United States. She was visiting lecturer at Royal Holloway College in London between 2001 and 2002, and for the next academic year took up a post at Wadham College, Oxford, as an English lecturer. From 2003 to 2006, she was a post-doctoral research fellow with the British Academy and subsequently took up a post as a tutorial fellow at Wadham and, in 2014, was a visiting fellow at the Humanities Research Centre at the Australian National University. In 2015, she was awarded the title of Professor of English and World Literatures by the University of Oxford. Mukherjee also chaired the Preliminary Examinations board in the 2012–13 academic year. In 2015, she was awarded the Rose Mary Crawshay Prize by the British Academy.

Works 
Mukherjee's first book, Aesthetic Hysteria (2007), focused on Victorian literature. drawing on English literature from across the world, her second work, What is a Classic? (2014) studied the way that classic works of literature "emanate from postcolonial histories and societies"; the book won the British Academy's Mary Crawshay Prize for English Literature in 2015. A list of her works are included below:

 "Emergence", Critical Transitions: Trajectories of Change, ed. Marc Botha and Patricia Waugh (London: Bloomsbury, 2014)
 "Primetime Psychoanalysis", A Companion to Psychoanalysis, Literature, and Culture, ed. Laura Marcus and Ankhi Mukherjee (Oxford: Blackwell Publishers, 2013)
 What is a Classic? Postcolonial Rewriting and Invention of the Canon (Stanford University Press, 2013)
 Editor (with Laura Marcus), A Companion to Psychoanalysis, Literature, and Culture (Blackwell Publishers, 2013) 
 “Race: Victorian Literature”, Oxford Bibliographies Online, 2012
 “The Rushdie Canon,” Salman Rushdie: Contemporary Critical Perspectives, ed. Robert Eaglestone and Martin McQuillan (London: Bloomsbury, 2012)
 “Postcolonial Responses to the Western Canon,” The Cambridge History of Postcolonial Literature (2 volumes). Ed. Ato Quayson, Cambridge: CUP, 2011
 “‘This Traffic of Influence’: Derrida and Spivak,” Special Issue “Gayatri Spivak: Postcolonial and Other Pedagogies,” Parallax, vol. 60 (Summer 2011)
 “‘What is a Classic?’: International Literary Criticism and the Classic Question,” Special Topic “Literary Criticism for the Twenty-first Century,” ed. Cathy Caruth and Jonathan Culler, PMLA (October 2010)
 “‘Yes, sir, I was the one who got away’: Postcolonial Emergence and the Question of Global English,” Études Anglaises, no. 3 (2009)
 “Bhabha,” “Canonicity,” entries in Blackwell Encyclopaedia of Literary Theory (3 volumes), ed. Robert Eaglestone (Oxford: Blackwell Publishing, 2009)
 “The Death of the Novel and Two Postcolonial Writers,” special issue “Influence” ed. Andrew Elfenbein, Modern Language Quarterly, vol. 69, issue 4 (December 2008)
 Aesthetic Hysteria: The Great Neurosis in Victorian Melodrama and Contemporary Fiction (Routledge, 2007)
 “Fissured Skin, Inner Ear Radio, and a Telepathic Nose: The Senses as Media in Salman Rushdie’s Midnight’s Children,” Paragraph, vol. 29, issue 6 (November 2006)
 “Buried Alive: The Gothic Carceral in V. S. Naipaul’s Fiction,” special issue “V.S. Naipaul” ed. Pradyumna Chauhan, South Asian Review (Fall 2005)
 “Missed Encounters: Repetition, Rewriting, and Contemporary Returns to Charles Dickens’s Great Expectations,” Contemporary Literature, vol. 46, issue 1 (Spring 2005)
 “Stammering to Story: Neurosis and Narration in Pat Barker’s Regeneration,” Critique: Studies in Contemporary Fiction, vol. 43 (Fall 2001)

References 

Year of birth missing (living people)
Living people
Academics of the University of Oxford
Fellows of Wadham College, Oxford